Sunniva Hakestad Møller (5 January 1907 – 30 May 1995) was a Norwegian politician for the Labour Party.

She was elected to the Norwegian Parliament from Rogaland in 1958, and was re-elected on two occasions.

Møller was born in Haugesund and was involved in local politics in Haugesund between 1937 and 1955.

References

1907 births
1995 deaths
People from Haugesund
Labour Party (Norway) politicians
Women members of the Storting
Members of the Storting
20th-century Norwegian women politicians
20th-century Norwegian politicians